The Ouachita County Courthouse is located at 145 Jefferson Avenue in Camden, Arkansas, the seat of Ouachita County.  The two-story brick and concrete structure was designed by Little Rock architect Thomas Harding, and completed in 1933.  The architecturally distinctive building exhibits a restrained Colonial Revival style (which was then passing out of fashion, with elements of Art Deco.  It is a T-shaped building with symmetrical wings flanking a Classical style columned and gabled portico.

The building was listed on the National Register of Historic Places in 1989.

See also
National Register of Historic Places listings in Ouachita County, Arkansas

References

Courthouses on the National Register of Historic Places in Arkansas
Colonial Revival architecture in Arkansas
Government buildings completed in 1933
Buildings and structures in Camden, Arkansas
County courthouses in Arkansas
National Register of Historic Places in Ouachita County, Arkansas
1933 establishments in Arkansas